Care Bears: The Giving Festival is a 2010 American computer-animated fantasy film starring the Care Bears characters. It was made by SD Entertainment and released on DVD by Lionsgate on November 2, 2010.  In the film, the Care Power Team—which includes Funshine Bear, Cheer Bear and Share Bear—organizes their annual Giving Festival, and must rescue a princess named Starglo from impending weather.

Release
The DVD of The Giving Festival features an episode of the CBS series, Adventures in Care-a-lot, containing the stories "Belly Blanked" and "All Give and No Take".

Reception
As of November 2010, the film has received mixed reviews.  C.S. Strowbridge of The Numbers, a box-office tracking website, said that it "is exactly what you would expect from the Care Bears. It's not exactly a feature-length film, and it feels a little episodic, but it is bright and full of adventure."  Writing for DVD Talk, Paul Mavis gave it one star out of five.  Deeming it "Dishonest right from the get-go", he also said, "When I want a Care Bears Christmas movie ... and I do ... I want it to actually be about Christmas, not some wishy-washy P.C. 'Giving Festival' euphemism."

See also
 List of American films of 2010
 List of computer-animated films

References

External links
 
 Care Bears: The Giving Festival at starz.com

2010 direct-to-video films
2010 films
American children's animated fantasy films
American computer-animated films
American direct-to-video films
American Christmas films
Care Bears films
Direct-to-video animated films
Direct-to-video sequel films
Lionsgate films
Lionsgate animated films
2010 computer-animated films
2010s American animated films
Films directed by Davis Doi
2010s children's animated films
2010s English-language films